The Special Service Medal is a military service medal of the Indian Armed Forces. The Special Service Medal is awarded under active service conditions for minor operations or operations of short duration. Clasps are awarded with the medal indicating the particular operation for which it is awarded. For subsequent operations where the clasp is approved, only the Clasp denoting the particular operation is awarded. The name of the operation's location is inscribed on the clasp's bar.

It is an octagonal medal, made of copper-nickel alloy. It has a falcon inscribed on the front and the  state emblem with the name of the medal inscribed on the back.

See also
Indian military decorations

References

Military awards and decorations of India